Many cities are served by more than one airport, typically to avoid congestion, and where there may be factors preventing expansion of existing airports. In other cities, multiple airports may be built to cater for different uses, such as international and domestic flights. (For instance domestic flights may use smaller aircraft which can use a shorter runway.) The following lists cities which are served by more than one airport offering scheduled passenger services. Airports are included even if they are not within the city boundaries. Military airbases (without passenger service) and airports with only charter flights or cargo service are not included.

Four or more airports

Three airports

 Argentina, Buenos Aires
 Aeroparque Jorge Newbery
 El Palomar Airport
 Ministro Pistarini International Airport
 Brazil, São Paulo
 São Paulo–Congonhas Airport
 São Paulo/Guarulhos International Airport
 Viracopos International Airport
 Canada, Toronto, Ontario
 Billy Bishop Toronto City Airport
 John C. Munro Hamilton International Airport
 Toronto Pearson International Airport
 Italy, Milan
 Milan Linate Airport
 Milan Malpensa Airport
 Orio al Serio International Airport
 Japan, Nagoya
 Chubu Centrair International Airport
 Nagoya Airfield
 Shizuoka Airport
 Japan, Osaka
 Itami Airport
 Kansai International Airport
 Kobe Airport
 Mexico, Mexico City
 Benito Juárez International Airport
 Felipe Ángeles International Airport
 Toluca International Airport
 Philippines, Manila
 Clark International Airport
 Ninoy Aquino International Airport
 Subic Bay International Airport
 Spain, Barcelona
 Girona-Costa Brava Airport
 Josep Tarradellas Barcelona–El Prat Airport
 Reus Airport
 United States, Chicago, Illinois
 Chicago Midway International Airport
 Chicago O'Hare International Airport
 Chicago Rockford International Airport
 United States, Miami, Florida
 Miami International Airport
 Fort Lauderdale–Hollywood International Airport
 Palm Beach International Airport
 United States, Orlando, Florida
 Melbourne Orlando International Airport
 Orlando International Airport
 Orlando Sanford International Airport
 United States, Tampa, Florida
 Sarasota–Bradenton International Airport
 St. Pete–Clearwater International Airport
 Tampa International Airport
 United States, Washington, D.C.
 Baltimore/Washington International Thurgood Marshall Airport
 Ronald Reagan Washington National Airport
 Washington Dulles International Airport

Two airports

 Belgium, Brussels
 Brussels National Airport
 Brussels South Charleroi Airport
 Belize, Belize City
 Belize City Municipal Airport
 Philip S. W. Goldson International Airport
 Bolivia, Santa Cruz
 El Trompillo Airport
 Viru Viru International Airport
 Brazil, Belo Horizonte
 Belo Horizonte/Pampulha – Carlos Drummond de Andrade Airport
 Tancredo Neves International Airport
 Brazil, Rio de Janeiro
 Rio de Janeiro/Galeão International Airport
 Santos Dumont Airport
 Canada, Montréal, Quebec
 Montréal–Trudeau International Airport
 Montréal Saint-Hubert Longueuil Airport
 Canada, Vancouver, British Columbia
 Abbotsford International Airport
 Vancouver International Airport
 China, Beijing
 Beijing Capital International Airport
 Beijing Daxing International Airport
 China, Chengdu
 Chengdu Shuangliu International Airport
 Chengdu Tianfu International Airport
 China, Shanghai
 Shanghai Hongqiao International Airport
 Shanghai Pudong International Airport
 Colombia, Medellín
 Enrique Olaya Herrera Airport
 José María Córdova International Airport
 Democratic Republic of the Congo, Kinshasa
 N'djili Airport
 N'Dolo Airport
 Costa Rica, San José
 Juan Santamaría International Airport
 Tobías Bolaños International Airport
 Dominica, Roseau
 Canefield Airport
 Douglas–Charles Airport
 Dominican Republic, Samaná
 Arroyo Barril Airport
 Samaná El Catey International Airport
 Dominican Republic, Santo Domingo
 La Isabela International Airport
 Las Américas International Airport
 Guyana, Georgetown
 Cheddi Jagan International Airport
 Eugene F. Correira International Airport
 Iceland, Reykjavík
 Keflavík International Airport
 Reykjavík Airport
 India, Delhi
 Hindon Airport
 Indira Gandhi International Airport
 India, Goa
 Dabolim Airport
 Mopa Airport
 Indonesia, Jakarta
 Halim Perdanakusuma International Airport
 Soekarno–Hatta International Airport
 Indonesia, Yogyakarta
 Adisutjipto Airport
 Yogyakarta International Airport
 Iran, Tehran
 Imam Khomeini International Airport
 Mehrabad International Airport
 Italy, Rome
 Ciampino–G. B. Pastine International Airport
 Leonardo da Vinci–Fiumicino Airport
 Italy, Turin
 Cuneo International Airport
 Turin Airport
 Italy, Venice
 Treviso Airport
 Venice Marco Polo Airport
 Japan, Sapporo
 New Chitose Airport
 Okadama Airport
 Kenya, Nairobi
 Jomo Kenyatta International Airport
 Wilson Airport
 Liberia, Monrovia
 Roberts International Airport
 Spriggs Payne Airport
 Libya, Tripoli
 Mitiga International Airport
 Tripoli International Airport
 Malaysia, Kuala Lumpur
 Kuala Lumpur International Airport
 Sultan Abdul Aziz Shah Airport
 Mexico, Monterrey, Nuevo León
 Del Norte International Airport
 General Mariano Escobedo International Airport
 Namibia, Windhoek
 Eros Airport
 Hosea Kutako International Airport
 New Caledonia, Nouméa
 La Tontouta International Airport
 Magenta Airport
 Nigeria, Port Harcourt, Rivers State
 Port Harcourt International Airport
 Port Harcourt City Airport
 Norway, Oslo
 Oslo Airport, Gardermoen
 Sandefjord Airport, Torp
 Panama, Panama City
 Albrook "Marcos A. Gelabert" International Airport
 Tocumen International Airport
 Poland, Warsaw
 Warsaw Chopin Airport
 Warsaw-Modlin Mazovia Airport
 Puerto Rico, San Juan
 Fernando Luis Ribas Dominicci Airport
 Luis Muñoz Marín International Airport
 Russia, Krasnoyarsk
 Krasnoyarsk Cheremshanka Airport
 Yemelyanovo International Airport
 Russia, Ulyanovsk
 Ulyanovsk Baratayevka Airport
 Ulyanovsk Vostochny Airport
 Saint Lucia, Castries
 George F. L. Charles Airport
 Hewanorra International Airport
 Sierra Leone, Freetown
 Hastings Airport
 Lungi International Airport
 Singapore
 Changi Airport
 Seletar Airport
 Somalia, Mogadishu
 Aden Adde International Airport
 K50 Airport
 South Africa, Johannesburg
 Lanseria International Airport
 O. R. Tambo International Airport
 South Korea, Gwangju
 Gwangju Airport
 Muan International Airport
 South Korea, Seoul
 Gimpo International Airport
 Incheon International Airport
 Spain, Santa Cruz de Tenerife
 Tenerife North–Ciudad de La Laguna Airport
 Tenerife South Airport
 Sri Lanka, Colombo
 Bandaranaike International Airport
 Ratmalana Airport
 Suriname, Paramaribo
 Johan Adolf Pengel International Airport
 Zorg en Hoop Airport
 Taiwan, Taipei
 Taipei Songshan Airport
 Taiwan Taoyuan International Airport
 Thailand, Bangkok
 Don Mueang International Airport
 Suvarnabhumi Airport
 Turkey, Istanbul
 Istanbul Airport
 Istanbul Sabiha Gökçen International Airport
 Turkey, Muğla
 Dalaman Airport
 Milas–Bodrum Airport
 Ukraine, Kyiv
 Boryspil International Airport
 Igor Sikorsky Kyiv International Airport (Zhuliany)
 United Arab Emirates, Dubai
 Al Maktoum International Airport
 Dubai International Airport
 United Kingdom, Belfast, Northern Ireland
 Belfast International Airport
 George Best Belfast City Airport
 United Kingdom, Glasgow, Scotland
 Glasgow Abbotsinch Airport
 Glasgow Prestwick Airport
 United Kingdom, Lerwick, Scotland
 Sumburgh Airport
 Tingwall Airport
 United States, Buffalo, New York
 Buffalo Niagara International Airport
 Niagara Falls International Airport
 United States, Charlotte, North Carolina
 Charlotte Douglas International Airport
 Concord-Padgett Regional Airport
 United States, Cleveland, Ohio
 Akron–Canton Airport
 Cleveland Hopkins International Airport
 United States, Columbus, Ohio
 John Glenn Columbus International Airport
 Rickenbacker International Airport
 United States, Dallas, Texas
 Dallas/Fort Worth International Airport
 Dallas Love Field
 United States, Houston, Texas
 George Bush Intercontinental Airport
 William P. Hobby Airport
 United States, Philadelphia, Pennsylvania/Atlantic City, New Jersey
 Atlantic City International Airport
 Philadelphia International Airport
 United States, Phoenix, Arizona
 Phoenix-Mesa Gateway Airport
 Phoenix Sky Harbor International Airport
 United States, Pittsburgh, Pennsylvania
 Arnold Palmer Regional Airport
 Pittsburgh International Airport
 United States, St. Louis, Missouri/Belleville, Illinois
 MidAmerica St. Louis Airport
 St. Louis Lambert International Airport
 United States, San Diego, California/Mexico, Tijuana
 San Diego International Airport
 Tijuana International Airport (via CBX Terminal)
 United States, Seattle, Washington
 Paine Field
 Seattle-Tacoma International Airport
 United States, Virginia Beach-Norfolk, Virginia
 Newport News/Williamsburg International Airport
 Norfolk International Airport

See also
List of defunct international airports

References

Lists of cities
Cities